Birmingham police may refer to:

In Birmingham, England:

 Birmingham City Police
 Birmingham Airport Police
 Birmingham Market Police
 Birmingham Parks Police

In Birmingham, Alabama:

 Birmingham Police Department (Alabama)